92.1 One FM (DZYM 92.1 MHz) is an FM station owned and operated by Radio Corporation of the Philippines. Its studios and transmitter are located along Felix Y. Manalo Ave., Brgy. Pag-asa, San Jose, Occidental Mindoro.

References

External links
One FM FB Page
One FM Mindoro FB Page

Radio stations in Mindoro
Radio stations established in 2017